Cacia butuana is a species of beetle in the family Cerambycidae. It was described by Heller in 1923.

Subspecies
 Cacia butuana butuana Heller, 1923
 Cacia butuana negria Heller, 1924

References

Cacia (beetle)
Beetles described in 1923